Sasurbari Zindabad (English: Three Cheers for the In-laws) is a Bengali film directed by Haranath Chakraborty, starring Prosenjit Chatterjee and Rituparna Sengupta. It created a box-office record by becoming the highest grossing Bengali film ever at that point of time when it released in 2000. The film was a remake of the 1989 Telugu film Attaku Yamudu Ammayiki Mogudu.

Plot summary 

Mrs. Binodini Roy, a renowned industrialist, wants to marry off her elder daughter Rupa to her business partner's son. Rupa is against the marriage and hence she escapes from her house with the help of her father. On the way to one of her uncle's house, a cabbie tries to rob her belongings. But she is saved by a handsome motor-mechanic named Somu. Somu takes her to her uncle's house where he turns out to be one of his acquaintances. Gradually, Rupa and Somu come close to each other. One day they have a heated argument; but it's precisely after this that they realize their love for each other. They make up and even get married secretly without informing Rupa's mother. Soon, on her father's request, Rupa returns home. Her mother refuses to acknowledge her marriage; instead she decides to marry her off to her former match. On the day of her marriage, just when Rupa had given up all hope; Somu makes a dramatic entry to take charge of his ‘sasurbari’ (in-laws’ house). But is it only his love for Rupa that has brought him here; or does Somu have a secret of his own?

Cast

 Prosenjit Chatterjee as Somu
 Rituparna Sengupta as Rupa
 Ranjit Mallick as Achintya, Rupa's Father
 Anamika Saha as Binodini Roy, Rupa's Mother
 Subhashish Mukherjee  as Bhombol (servant)
 Tota Roy Chowdhury as Prasanta Mitra
 Anuradha Ray Bibhabari
 Bharat Kaul as Rana

Box office 

Sasurbari Zindabad created box-office history by becoming the first Bengali film to cross the 2 crore mark in West Bengal. Made on a large budget of 60–70 lakh, the film's final box-office collections reached a staggering 2.50 crore; thus fulfilling all criteria to be adjudged an ‘All-Time Blockbuster’. In the process, it went past previous Prosenjit-Rituparna blockbusters like Sudhu Ekbar Bolo, Baba Keno Chakor and Moner Manush to become the highest grosser ever. It eventually completed a ‘Golden Jubilee’ by running for a period exceeding 50 weeks in the Bengal districts. It held the highest grosser record for  years until another Haranath Chakraborty directorial, Sathi overtook its tally.

Satellite rights 

The film's satellite rights were at first awarded to the Bengali GEC ETV Bangla. But in 2009, the rights were transferred to the leading Bengali GEC Star Jalsha. At present only two channels, Star Jalsha and Jalsha Movies have the right to officially broadcast the film worldwide.

Video rights 

The official video rights of this film have been purchased by Eskay Video, the most reputed video company in West Bengal. As of May 2013, the MRP is 49.

Legacy 

Sasurbari Zindabad introduced a number of new trends in Bengali cinema which were attributed as the main factors behind the film's smashing performance. The factors were:

1) Big Budget - Previously, the average budget for a Bengali film used to be around 10 to 15 lakhs. But this film changed the trend by investing nearly 70 lakhs. A substantial amount of this budget was spent on improved picture quality, technology, grandeur, sets, costumes, and shooting locales which increased the attractiveness of the film. Buoyed by the film's humongous success, producers became more confident and budgets of Bengali films gradually picked up.

2) CinemaScope - Barring a few exceptions, CinemaScope was non-existent in Tollywood. This film re-introduced CinemaScope which lends a brighter, colourful and more attractive visual appeal to the film. Soon, CinemaScope became a regular feature in Bengali films.

3) Bollywood Art Director - Kaushik Sarkar, art director of Shah Rukh Khan starrer Yes Boss was roped in to do the production designing of this film. High-quality colourful sets made it the most glamorous Bengali film at that time. As a result, the other film-makers were forced to abandon the degraded production quality prevalent then in Tollywood.

4) Designer Clothes - Fashion designers were approached to do the costumes of Prosenjit and Rituparna. Hence, both of them looked their best in this film and their scorching chemistry set the screens on fire. Down the decade, designer clothes are the norm in Tollywood now.

5) Liplock - Prosenjit and Rituparna did a full-blown liplock in this film which lasted for nearly 30 seconds. This was one of the first such instances of a couple kissing each other on the lips in the history of mainstream Bengali cinema. Before this, the only other film for which the incredibly popular pair of Prosenjit and Rituparna locked lips (in multiple sequences) was Rituparno Ghosh’s cult-classic Utsab, which had its festival premiere just 3 weeks back. In that film they had gone one step further and performed a bold sex scene as well. After Sasurbari Zindabad, both Rituparna and Prosenjit engaged in quite a few intimate sequences with other heroes and heroines; but they never locked lips with each other again.

Trivia 

The title of the film itself is missing from the entire opening credits of the film.
This remains the highest-grossing Bengali film of Rituparna Sengupta's entire career. Also, this was her last association with Shree Venkatesh Films, the biggest production house in Tollywood. Before this, she had collaborated with them in Mayar Badhon and Tumi Ele Tai; both of which were again opposite Prosenjit. She also never worked with Haranath Chakraborty again except for a song-sequence in Chhayamoy (2013).
The film has a lot of striking similarities with the Aamir Khan-Karishma Kapoor starrer Raja Hindustani (1996). In both the films, the heroine's father is a kind-hearted man while the mother is presented as a vamp. There the hero is a taxi-driver in a hill town; while here the hero is a motor-mechanic also residing in a hill town. There the hero beats up a bunch of baddies after they tease the heroine for wearing a short dress. They have a huge argument over this, but they repent and soon make up. The whole sequence is exactly replicated here as well. There the hero performs a dance after being drunk in a party thrown by his in-laws, which his wife totally disapproves of. A very similar sequence is shown here as well, with the only difference being that the hero here was feigning to be drunk. And of course, both the films famously featured a lengthy and intense lip-lock between the leads, which was extremely rare in their times.

Soundtrack

References

External links 
 

Bengali-language Indian films
2000s Bengali-language films
Bengali remakes of Telugu films
Films scored by Babul Bose
Films directed by Haranath Chakraborty